Baselios Geevarghese I of the East (born Vaakathanam Karuchira Geevarghese, consecrated bishop as Mar Philoxenos) (11 January 1870 – 17 December 1928) popularly known as Vallikkattu Bava, he was the second Catholicos of the Malankara Orthodox Syrian Church in India. He was installed in the Apostolic Throne of St. Thomas in 1925, and died after a short tenure of three years on 17 December 1928. Bava was revered as a saint by orthodox believers and the tomb in which his mortal remains are interred attracts pilgrims from all over Malankara.

Early life
Bava was born in the ancient orthodox Vallikkattu Karuchira family in Vakathanam, Kottayam district on 11 January 1870. After basic education at his native place, Vakathanam, at Kottayam he mastered in Syriac, the liturgical language of the church. He opted to become a sanyasi priest and at a very young age of sixteen, he was ordained as a deacon. The bishop Kadavil Paulose Mar Athanasius (Aluva) was his spiritual teacher with whom he spent years as secretary. He was ordained as a priest and remban by Kadavil Mar Athanasius in 1896.

After the demise of his teacher in 1907, he moved from Aluva to Vallikkattu dayara at Vakathanam, where he spent the rest of his life. He was consecrated bishop at the historical Niranam Church in February 1913 by the Syriac Orthodox Patriarch of Antioch Ignatius Abdul Masih II assisted by the Catholicos Baseliose Paulose I. The new bishop assumed the name Geevarghese Mar Phelexinose (or Philoxenos) and was given charges of Kottayam and Angamaly dioceses.

As Catholicos
On 30 April 1925, he was elevated to the supreme ecclesiastical position in Malankara Orthodox Church. He was ordained the Catholicos of the East and assumed the title, Baselios Geevarghese I. Following an operation for appendicitis, he died on 17 December 1928.

Work and Reputation
Vallikkattu Bava was considered a saint even during his lifetime. His life style was noted for simplicity, austerity, and punctuality. Bava used to keep a personal diary, which has become an authentic source of history of his times. Bava translated parts of gospels, and many liturgical works from Syriac to Malayalam. Publication of the first Sabha Panchangam (calendar) goes to his credit. He had evinced a keen interest in church architecture and many churches and buildings built during his times bear testimonies to his architectural skills. An account of his sea trip to Ceylon as a part of a church delegation is considered a beautiful piece of Malayalam travelogues written at that time.

Death
His mortal remains are interred in the tomb at Vallikkattu dayara, where he spent most of his life. The dayara was renovated in 1982 by the then Baselios Marthoma Mathews I and has emerged as one of the very important spiritual and pilgrimage centres of the Malankara Church. He was succeeded by Baselios Geevarghese II

References

Indian Oriental Orthodox Christians
Catholicoi of the East and Malankara Metropolitans
Indian Christian religious leaders
People from Kottayam district
1870 births
1928 deaths